Alice in Wonderland is a 1933 American pre-Code fantasy film adapted from the novels by Lewis Carroll. The film was produced by Paramount Pictures, featuring an all-star cast. It is all live action, except for the Walrus and The Carpenter sequence, which was animated by Harman-Ising Studio.

Stars include W. C. Fields as Humpty Dumpty, Edna May Oliver as the Red Queen, Cary Grant as the Mock Turtle, Gary Cooper as The White Knight, Edward Everett Horton as The Hatter, Charles Ruggles as The March Hare, Richard Arlen as the Cheshire Cat, Baby LeRoy as The Joker, and Charlotte Henry in her first leading role as Alice.

This adaptation was directed by Norman Z. McLeod from a screenplay by Joseph L. Mankiewicz and William Cameron Menzies, based on Lewis Carroll's books Alice in Wonderland (1865) and Alice Through the Looking-Glass (1871). It also drew heavily from Eva Le Gallienne and Florida Friebus's then-recent stage adaptation.

When Paramount previewed the film in 1933, the original running time was 90 minutes. By the time it was shown to the press, it was truncated to 77 minutes. Many reviews, including the savage one in Variety, made a point of how long it seemed at an hour-and-a-quarter. Though being released at this shorter time, it is often mistakenly reported that Universal Pictures edited it when it bought the television rights in the late 1950s. Universal released the film on DVD on March 2, 2010, as the first home video release.

It is the only major live-action Hollywood theatrical production to adapt the original Alice stories. The next major live-action Hollywood production to do so is a two-part adaptation for television in 1985, and the second major live-action Hollywood production for movie theaters to use the title Alice in Wonderland was made by Tim Burton for Disney in 2010 as a sequel to the original story.

Plot
Alice (Charlotte Henry) and Dinah live peacefully in their home, until chasing a White Rabbit into a hole. Falling in, Alice is transported to various doors. She drinks a bottle that reads "Drink Me, Not Poison", which makes her grow big. Her tears flood the room while weeping. She eats a cookie and turns tiny. Swimming in her tears, she meets a couple of odd men named Tweedle Dee and Tweedle Dum. She encounters a tea party, where the Mad Hatter and March Hare live. She meets the Cheshire Cat, then she meets Humpty Dumpty, who tells her what an unbirthday is. She leaves and meets a caterpillar and changes size again. Alice returns to her normal size and runs away from the caterpillar and meets the Queen of Hearts. They play croquet by grabbing a flamingo by the neck. Alice is welcomed to a castle, realizing that she is Queen or Princess of the land. The people of Wonderland start to go crazy. Alice gets choked by the Queen, wakes up in her room, and lives happily ever after.

Cast

Richard Arlen as Cheshire Cat
Roscoe Ates as Fish Footman
William Austin as Gryphon
Gary Cooper as White Knight
Leon Errol as Uncle Gilbert
Louise Fazenda as White Queen
W.C. Fields as Humpty Dumpty
Alec B. Francis as King of Hearts
Richard "Skeets" Gallagher as White Rabbit
Cary Grant as Mock Turtle
Lillian Harmer as The Cook
Raymond Hatton as The Mouse
Charlotte Henry as Alice
Sterling Holloway as Frog Footman
Edward Everett Horton as The Hatter
Roscoe Karns as Tweedledee
Baby LeRoy as The Joker
Mae Marsh as The Sheep
Polly Moran as The Dodo
Jack Oakie as Tweedledum
Edna May Oliver as Red Queen
May Robson as Queen of Hearts
Charlie Ruggles as March Hare
Jackie Searl as The Dormouse
Alison Skipworth as Duchess
Ned Sparks as Caterpillar
Ford Sterling as White King

Uncredited

 Billy Barty as White Pawn/The Pig-Baby
 Billy Bevan as Two of Spades
Colin Campbell as Frog Gardener
Jack Duffy as Leg of Mutton
Meyer Grace as the Third Executioner
Ethel Griffies as Ms. Simpson
Charles McNaughton as Five of Spades
Patsy O'Byrne as Aunt
George Ovey as Plum Pudding
Will Stanton as Seven of Spades
Joe Torillo as Second Executioner

Reception

Its status as a box office bomb cast doubt on whether a live-action fantasy with strange-looking characters could be successfully presented on the screen, until MGM's The Wizard of Oz (1939). It was banned in China under a category of "superstitious films" for its "strangeness" and unscientific elements.

Variety magazine said that the timeless classic book is too surrealistic and adult-oriented to have a good film adaptation. It said the film is "vividly realized" with genuine humor and a satisfying literary treatment, and the cast is "a stunning aggregation of screen names", but the experience is a non-sequitur "volume of separate four-line gags".

References

External links

Review at TVGuide.com 
Reprints of historic reviews, photo gallery at CaryGrant.net
Alice in Wonderland available for free download from the Internet Archive

1930s fantasy films
1933 films
American black-and-white films
American fantasy films
Censored films
Films scored by Dimitri Tiomkin
Films based on Alice in Wonderland
Films based on multiple works
Films directed by Norman Z. McLeod
Puppet films
Paramount Pictures films
Films with screenplays by Joseph L. Mankiewicz
Works banned in China
1930s English-language films
1930s American films